Qaleh-ye Bakhtiar or Qaleh-ye Bakhteyar may refer to:
 Qaleh-ye Bakhtiar, Chaharmahal and Bakhtiari
 Qaleh-ye Bakhtiar, Hamadan